Springwater is a special service area in the Rural Municipality of Biggar No. 347, Saskatchewan, Canada. It held village status prior to December 31, 2006. Springwater is located south of Lydden Lake, west of Springwater Lake and southeast of Sunny Lake. It is also the location of the Springwater Meteorite found in 1931 near Springwater.

Demographics 

See also 
 List of communities in Saskatchewan
 List of hamlets in Saskatchewan

References 

Biggar No. 347, Saskatchewan
Designated places in Saskatchewan
Former villages in Saskatchewan
Populated places disestablished in 2006
Special service areas in Saskatchewan
Division No. 12, Saskatchewan